Bzigo is a technology start-up company that develops autonomous devices for a pest-free life. Its first product detects and locates mosquitoes, and future products will both detect and eliminate mosquitoes and other pests autonomously. The company was founded by Nadav Benedek and Saar Wilf, who are both alumni of the Israel Defense Forces' intelligence Unit 8200.

Significance
Mosquitoes are the worst of the disease-transmitting insects, infecting around 700 million people and killing 1 million annually, so implementing this technology in parts of the world where mosquito-borne diseases are prevalent could improve health and save lives.

Even in areas without malaria or other diseases, the presence of mosquitoes can decrease sleep quality, some people have mosquito allergies (“skeeter syndrome”), and they are a general nuisance.

Future generations of the device will be optimized for industrial usages such as pest extermination in greenhouses and large farms, as well as deterring other pests like pigeons.

Technology
The Bzigo device scans a room for mosquitoes using specialized optics and computer vision algorithms to identify the flight patterns of mosquitoes.
Once it detects that a mosquito has landed, the device marks its location with a pointer and sends a message to a phone application, allowing the recipient to locate the pest and kill it. The device is compliant with all safety standards and regulations.

Pricing
The first generation of the Bzigo designator is expected to cost $199.

References

External links

 

Insect control
Consumer electronics brands
Smart devices
Indoor positioning system
American companies established in 2016
Electronics companies established in 2016